Rosalind Miles may refer to:
 Rosalind Miles (actress) (1940-2022), American actress and fashion model
 Rosalind Miles (author) (born 1943), English author